John Henry "Rip" Vowinkel (November 18, 1884 – July 13, 1966) was a Major League Baseball pitcher. In six career games, he had a 3–3 record with a 4.17 ERA. He batted and threw left-handed.

Vowinkel was born and died in Oswego, New York.

External links
Baseball Reference.com page

1884 births
1966 deaths
Cincinnati Reds players
Major League Baseball pitchers
Baseball players from New York (state)
Utica Pent-Ups players
Buffalo Bisons (minor league) players
Newark Indians players
Harrisburg Senators players